PPARG coactivator 1 alpha is a protein that in humans is encoded by the PPARGC1A gene.

Function

The protein encoded by this gene is a transcriptional coactivator that regulates the genes involved in energy metabolism. This protein interacts with PPARgamma, which permits the interaction of this protein with multiple transcription factors. This protein can interact with, and regulate the activities of, cAMP response element binding protein (CREB) and nuclear respiratory factors (NRFs). It provides a direct link between external physiological stimuli and the regulation of mitochondrial biogenesis, and is a major factor that regulates muscle fiber type determination. This protein may be also involved in controlling blood pressure, regulating cellular cholesterol homoeostasis, and the development of obesity.

References

Further reading